Yeremeyevo (Yärmi) is a rural locality (a selo) and the administrative centre of Yeremeyevsky Selsoviet, Chishminsky District, Bashkortostan, Russia. The population was 543 as of 2010. There are 23 streets.

Geography 
Yeremeyevo is located 4 km northwest of Chishmy (the district's administrative centre) by road. Kavetka is the nearest rural locality.

References 

Rural localities in Chishminsky District